Battal Gazi Destanı (Battal Ghazi Legend) is a 1971 Turkish historic action film. Starring Cüneyt Arkın, it is a depiction of the life of the legendary Muslim Serdar of Malatya, Battal Gazi. Moreover, it is the first one of four "Battal Gazi" series and one of the numerous historic movies of Cüneyt Arkın.

Plot
Hüseyin Gazi, the father of Battal Gazi, is killed in an ambush by three Byzantine warlords. His son decides to take revenge. Two of the warlords are rather easy targets and Battal manages to eliminate them but the last warlord turns out to be the Byzantine Emperor, Leon. In his journey, Battal faces with the greatest Christian knight, Hammer. After a fight between the two, Hammer loses and converts to Islam and becomes the best friend of Battal Gazi.

The film carries on the classical patterns of the Turkish cinema in many fields. First, there are clear prejudices about the Byzantine side. They are depicted as vandals. Second, there is a couple of battles where Battal fights against a whole army and defeats them all. Third, the fancy medieval costumes, like plumed helmets, are present in the film too. It is also a well known film for its quotes which are even used as samples in songs. The most famous one is being "Ben senin kancık kelleni ödlek bedeninden ayırmaya geldim!" (I came here to sever your bitchy head off your cowardly body!).

Another setback in the film is the depiction of Battal Ghazi as a Turcoman. While, there is a possibility of such a thing, Battal was probably an Arab. Malatya wouldn't fall under the Turkic control until the arrival of Seljuks in the 11th century. Still, the film is a popular milestone in the "wave of history" in the Turkish cinema between the late 1960s and early 1980s.

Cast 
 Cüneyt Arkın ... Battal Gazi / Hüseyin Gazi
 Fikret Hakan ... Ahmet Turani / Hammer
 Meral Zeren ...  Ayşe
 Reha Yurdakul ... Hileryon
 Kerim Afşar ... Imperator Leon
 Melek Görgün ... Irene
 Aynur Akarsu ... Faustina	
 Erden Alkan ... Delibaş Kiryos Alyon
 Ali Taygun ... Bizans Kargası Polemon
 Niyazi Er ... Budala Testor	
 Ekrem Gökkaya ... Vezir Abdusselam
 Atıf Kaptan ... Ömer Bey
 Baki Tamer ... Tevabil Usta

Production

Release

References

External links
 
Hammer converts to Islam in a brothel named Kırk Bakire Tapınağı (Temple of the Forty Virgins).
Sinematurk profile.

Films set in Turkey
1970s action films
Turkish historical adventure films
Turkish swashbuckler films
Turkish films about revenge
Turkish action adventure films
Films set in the 8th century
1970s historical adventure films
Interfaith romance films
Historical action films